Blackville is a civil parish in Northumberland County, New Brunswick, Canada.

For governance purposes it is divided between the incorporated rural community of Miramichi River Valley and the Greater Miramichi rural district, both of which are members of the Greater Miramichi Regional Service Commission.

Prior to the 2023 governance reform, the parish was divided between the village of Blackville and the local service districts of Renous-Quarryville and the parish of Blackville.

Origin of name
The parish was named in honour of William Black, Administrator of the province at the time of its erection due to the absence of Lieutenant-Governor Howard Douglas. Neighbouring Blissfield Parish was named in honour of John Murray Bliss, who was Administrator of the province prior to Douglas's arrival.

History
Blackville was erected in 1830 by the three-way split of Ludlow Parish, Blackville being the easternmost and Blissfield in the middle.

Boundaries
Blackville Parish is bounded:

 on the north by a line beginning at a point on the York County line near McConnell Brook, then running north 72º east by an astronomic bearing to a point 537 chains (10.8 kilometres) from the Canadian National Railway line through Quarryville on a line running north 22º west from the mouth of the Renous River;
 on the east by a line beginning 537 chains northwesterly of the above railway and running south 22º east through the mouth of Renous River to the Kent County line;
 on the south by the Kent County line;
 on the west by a line beginning at a point on the Kent County line about 3.1 kilometres south of Meadow Brook Lake and running north through the mouth of Donnelly Brook, which is on the southern bank of the Southwest Miramichi River west of Upper Blackville Bridge, to the starting point.

Evolution of boundaries
When Blackville was erected it extended to the Westmorland County line, including much of Harcourt and Huskisson Parishes. The original boundaries can be seen by prolonging the existing eastern and western boundaries of Blackville.

In 1845 the Kent County line was changed to run southwesterly instead of southeasterly, now meeting the line between Queens and Sunbury Counties. Most of Blackville's territory was transferred to Harcourt and Huskisson Parishes. The parish's boundaries were essentially the same as they are today.

Changes in the wording of the boundary with Northesk Parish and later Southesk Parish in 1850, 1877, and 1954 made little if any difference in the parish line.

Communities
Communities at least partly within the parish. bold indicates an incorporated municipality

  Arbeau Settlement
 Barnettville
 Bartholomew
  Blackville
 Breadalbane
 Coughlan
 Underhill
 Grainfield
  Gray Rapids
 Keenan Siding
  Lockstead
 McCann
 North Renous
 Pineville
  Renous
 Smiths Crossing
 Shinnickburn
 The Lots
  Upper Blackville
 Upper Blackville Bridge
  White Rapids

Bodies of water
Bodies of water at least partly within the parish.

 Bartholomew River
 Cains River
 Dungarvon River
 Renous River
 Sabbies River
 Southwest Miramichi River
 Meadow Brook Lake
 Smiths Lake
 South Lake

Islands
Islands at least partly within the parish.
 Doctors Island
 Morehouse Island
 Washburns Island

Other notable places
Parks, historic sites, and other noteworthy places at least partly within the parish.
 Dungarvon Whooper Spring Woodlot Protected Natural Area
 Dunphy Airstrip
 Shinnickburn Protected Natural Area

Demographics
Parish population total does not include former incorporated village of Blackville. Revised census figures based on the 2023 local governance reforms have not been released.

Population
Population trend

Language
Mother tongue (2016)

See also
List of parishes in New Brunswick

Notes

References

Parishes of Northumberland County, New Brunswick
Local service districts of Northumberland County, New Brunswick